Howard William Thomas Hobbs (born 22 January 1950) is an Australian politician who represented the seat of Warrego in the Legislative Assembly of Queensland from 1 November 1986 until his retirement at the 31 January 2015 state election. He was a member of the National Party of Australia until the Queensland division merged with the Liberal party to form the Liberal National Party of Queensland.

In February 1996, Hobbs was appointed as the Minister for Natural Resources in the Borbidge government. He resigned two years later, after his wife alleged that her husband was travelling with a young female staff member with whom he was having "an intimate and unprofessional relationship". It was later revealed that the staff member was Ann Leahy, who succeeded Hobbs as the member for Warrego in 2015.

Hobbs was Shadow Minister for Local Government and Planning and for Communities from 28 September 2005 until the LNP entered government following the 2012 election. As the longest-serving member of the Legislative Assembly, he presides at the election of Speakers. When he did so in 2009, Dean Wells equalled him in seniority, but Hobbs had taken the oath first because his name came first alphabetically, so he took the chair as Presiding Member. After Wells lost his seat at the 2012 election, Hobbs was the longest-serving member until his retirement at the 2015 state election.

Prior to parliament 
 Chairman, Tambo Shire Council, 1980–1987
 Tambo Shire Shire Councillor 1975-1980
 Served in 49 RQR (Royal Queensland Rifles) at Wacol

Personal life 
Hobbs has two children.

References

External links 
 Official Biography

1950 births
Living people
Members of the Queensland Legislative Assembly
National Party of Australia members of the Parliament of Queensland
Liberal National Party of Queensland politicians
21st-century Australian politicians